Moore County is the name of several counties in the United States:

 Moore County, North Carolina 
 Moore County, Tennessee 
 Moore County, Texas